The Men's 400m Individual Medley event at the 2003 Pan American Games took place on August 13, 2003 (Day 12 of the Games).

Medalists

Records

Results

Notes

References
usaswimming
swimnews

Medley, Men's 400m